Bill W. Benton is an American sound engineer. He won an Academy Award for Best Sound and has been nominated for two more in the same category. He has worked on more than 110 films since 1980.

Selected filmography
Benton won an Academy Award for Best Sound and has been nominated for another two:

Won
 Dances with Wolves (1990)

Nominated
 Geronimo: An American Legend (1993)
 Independence Day (1996)

References

External links

Year of birth missing (living people)
Living people
American audio engineers
Best Sound Mixing Academy Award winners